Edward Augustus Matthew Christopher Nestor MBE (born 5 June 1964) is a British actor, stand up comedian, television and radio presenter, who is best known for his starring roles in The Real McCoy and Desmond's, as well as playing a small role in Trainspotting.  Nestor has a radio programme in which he has a running joke with his claim to be about to turn thirty years old. 

He hosted, alongside Robbie Gee, the Imperial College Indian Society's annual "East Meets West" charity show in 2007 and 2008. The show, in both years, was one of the most successful and popular charity shows in the United Kingdom, drawing more than 1,750 people to the prestigious London Palladium in 2008.

Nestor appeared in the BBC's Canterbury Tales and is a former star on Casualty. He currently presents BBC Radio London's mid-morning from 10am to 2pm on Mondays to Thursdays. Nestor previously presented a show on BBC London on Friday evenings, from 10pm to 2am, that he called The Rum Shop. He also presented Drivetime for the network.

In 2016, he appeared as Freddie Hamilton in the television series by BBC, Death in Paradise, episode 5.5.  Although raised in Hackney, London, Nestor is a supporter of Manchester United, and presents a podcast by Manchester United, The Manchester United Red Cast, with Robert Meakin. He was voted "The Speech Broadcaster of the Year" at the Sony Radio Academy Awards 2007. 

In February 2007, Nestor was diagnosed as having Hodgkin's Lymphoma, and kept a blog of his treatment and reactions. He is currently in remission. In December 2017, Nestor was appointed an MBE in the Queen's New Year's Honours List for 2018 for his charity work and services to radio. , Nestor presents the Drive Time show for BBC Radio London, and he will move to the mid-morning slot on the station on 13 September 2021, presenting the programme on four days each week.

References

External links

Eddie Nestor (BBC Radio London)

English male comedians
English people of Dominica descent
English male television actors
English stand-up comedians
English radio presenters
Members of the Order of the British Empire
1964 births
Living people
People from Hackney Central